Viktor Aleksandrovich Mazyrin (30 May 1859, Alatyr – 1919, Moscow) was a Russian architect.

His father, a military doctor, died when Viktor was quite young.

He built several buildings for the Morozov family.

Mazyrin died of typhoid fever in 1919, and was buried in Moscow at the Pyatnitskoye cemetery.

Gallery

References

1859 births
1919 deaths
19th-century architects from the Russian Empire
20th-century Russian architects